Following is a list of all Article III United States federal judges appointed by President Chester A. Arthur during his presidency. In total Arthur appointed 21 Article III federal judges, including 2 Justices to the Supreme Court of the United States, 4 judges to the United States circuit courts, and 15 judges to the United States district courts. Arthur shared the appointment of Addison Brown with his predecessor, James A. Garfield, with Garfield placing him on the bench via a recess appointment and Arthur later nominating him to the same seat and issuing his commission. William White was confirmed by the United States Senate and received his commission from President Arthur, but died before taking the oath of office or commencing service. Nevertheless, he is counted as a successful appointment.

Arthur appointed 4 judges to the United States Court of Claims, an Article I tribunal.

United States Supreme Court justices

Circuit courts

District courts

Specialty courts (Article I)

United States Court of Claims

Notes

References
General

 

Specific

Sources
 Federal Judicial Center

Judicial appointments
Arthur